Colin Fleming (born April 27, 1984) is an American former racing driver & Formula 1 test driver who competed in the World Series by Renault 3.5, Formula Renault 2.0 Eurocup, and Formula Renault 2000 Germany with Jenzer Motorsport and Carlin Motorsport after a successful go-karting career, winning 10 North American and National Championships.

Racing career 
A former member from the Red Bull Junior Team, Fleming finished 3rd in the Formula Renault 2.0 Eurocup in 2004 and was rookie of the year in the Formula Renault 2000 Germany also in that year. He raced against fellow American and Californian and future Formula One driver Scott Speed. In 2005, he switched to the Formula Renault 3.5 with Swiss team Jenzer Motorsport, despite three DNS in the first 3 and missing one race of that season he finished 13th with 34 points with a best finish of 3rd in the second race in the Bugatti Circuit in LeMans, France. In 2006, he joined Carlin where he finished 6th in the first race of the season in Zolder. Later that year, he finished 4th in Circuit de Monaco and 8th in both races in Istanbul Park, but left Carlin and the Red Bull Junior team after the latter. Red Bull replaced him with fellow Red Bull Junior Team member and future Formula One Champion Sebastian Vettel.

After leaving Red Bull, he returned to the United States to complete in the Atlantic Championship mid-season.

Personal life 
He is currently a Executive Vice President of Marketing with Salesforce.

Complete motorsports results

American Open-Wheel racing results 
(key) (Races in bold indicate pole position, races in italics indicate fastest race lap)

2003 Barber Dodge Pro Series (Rookie of the Year, 5th in championship)

2004 German Formula Renault – 2nd in the Championship

2004 European Formula Renault – 3rd in the Championship

World Series by Renault 3.5 
(key) (Races in bold indicate pole position) (Races in italics indicate fastest lap)

References

External links 
 
 

1984 births
World Series Formula V8 3.5 drivers
Formula Renault Eurocup drivers
German Formula Renault 2.0 drivers
Racing drivers from San Diego
Atlantic Championship drivers
Living people
Barber Pro Series drivers
International Kart Federation drivers
Carlin racing drivers
Jenzer Motorsport drivers